Pets at Home is a British pet supplies retailer selling pet products including food, toys, bedding, medication, accessories and pets. It is listed on the London Stock Exchange and is a constituent of the FTSE 250 Index. Founded in 1991, the company operates 453 stores across the UK, as well as an online store. Pets at Home also provides a range of services such as grooming, veterinary care and dog training.

History
The first store was opened in Chester in 1991, by Anthony Preston.

In December 1999, Pets at Home acquired Petsmart UK, bringing a chain of 140 stores under Pets at Home branding.

Pets at Home was sold to Bridgepoint Capital for £230 million in July 2004.

In November 2007, the 200th store, Barnstaple, opened. On 27 January 2010, Pets at Home was sold by Bridgepoint Capital, to United States-based investment firm Kohlberg Kravis Roberts (KKR) for around £955 million.

The 17 September 2012 episode of BBC consumer affairs television programme Watchdog included a report on animal and fish welfare conditions at Pets at Home. The programme had visited eight stores, as part of an investigation which included Mike Jessop, former president of the Small Animal Veterinary Association. The programme discovered evidence of mistreatment of small animals, dead fish being left to rot and be eaten in tanks, and sick small animals up for sale. That month, Pets at Home issued a full response to the claims made in the broadcast. The BBC trust published a clarification on 7 June 2016 that the website included a version of the item made before Pets at Home's points in reply to criticisms were incorporated. In response to the complaint the programme-makers acknowledged that this represented a serious breach of the BBC's editorial standards and replaced the item with a version which reflected Pets at Home's points.

In March 2014, the company was the subject of an initial public offering.

In January 2018, KKR sold its remaining 12.3% stake in Pets at Home.

Operations
Pets at home operate 453 stores plus 316 grooming salons; Pets at Home also operate 394 veterinary surgeries operated on a joint venture partnership model and additionally 47 group managed veterinary practices. The joint venture businesses are generally small businesses which pay a percentage of turnover as a management fee to the company for back office services. The company runs a graduate training scheme intended to produce future joint venture partners.

The company owns Vets4Pets, a Guernsey-based veterinary business which operates a national network of joint venture partner veterinary practices focusing on treatment of small animals (domestic pets such as dogs, cats, rabbits etc.). The company enters into joint venture partnerships with veterinary professionals (usually a veterinary surgeon or veterinary nurse) to open new small animal practices. These practices are supported by 2 main support offices located in Swindon and Manchester which provide partners and their practices with full administrative support.

Management team 
The management team include:
 Lyssa McGowan - Chief Executive Officer
 Mike Iddon - Chief Financial Officer
 William Hewish - Chief Information Officer

Board of Directors 
Key members of the board are as follows:
 Ian Burke - Non-Executive Chairman
 Dennis Millard - Deputy Chairman & Senior Independent Non-Executive Director

References

Further reading
 
 
 "Weirdest items found in dogs' stomachs revealed by Vets4Pets". Huddersfield Daily Examiner.

External links
 Official website

Retail companies of the United Kingdom
British companies established in 1991
Retail companies established in 1991
Companies based in Cheshire
Pet stores
Kohlberg Kravis Roberts companies
Pets in the United Kingdom
Veterinary companies of the United Kingdom
Companies listed on the London Stock Exchange
1991 establishments in England
2004 mergers and acquisitions